is a railway station in the city of Handa, Aichi Prefecture, Japan, operated by Central Japan Railway Company (JR Tōkai).

Lines
Handa Station is served by the Taketoyo Line, and is located 14.6 kilometers from the starting point of the line at Ōbu Station.

Station layout
The station  has a single island platform connected to the station building by a footbridge. The station has automated ticket machines, TOICA automated turnstiles and is staffed.

Platforms

Adjacent stations

|-
!colspan=5|Central Japan Railway Company

Station history
Handa Station was opened on March 1, 1886 as a passenger and freight station on the Japanese Government Railways (JGR), but was relocated to its present location in 1896. In November 1910, an overpass connecting the platforms was completed. This is the oldest overpass in Japan.  The station building was expanded and rebuilt in 1912.  Freight operations commenced from April 1, 1903, and the station building was reconstructed at that time. The JGR became the Japan National Railway (JNR) after World War II. Freight operations were discontinued from November 15, 1975 and small parcel operations from February 1, 1984. With the privatization and dissolution of the JNR on April 1, 1987, the station came under the control of the  Central Japan Railway Company. Automatic turnstiles were installed in May 1992, and the TOICA system of magnetic fare cards was implemented in November 2006.  The Taketoyo Line, on which this station is, was electrified in 2015 and steps were taken to construct the overhead lines such that the overpass was preserved.

Station numbering was introduced to the Taketoyo Line in March 2018; Handa Station was assigned station number CE07.

Passenger statistics
In fiscal 2018, the station was used by an average of 1670 passengers daily (boarding passengers only).

Surrounding area
Handa City Hall
Handa Chamber of Commerce

See also
 List of Railway Stations in Japan

References

External links
Official home page 

Railway stations in Japan opened in 1886
Railway stations in Aichi Prefecture
Taketoyo Line
Stations of Central Japan Railway Company
Handa, Aichi